The Phony American is a 1961 West German film. It stars William Bendix and Ron Randell.

Cast
 Michael Hinz as Helmut Krauss
 Christine Kaufmann as Inge
 William Bendix as Sergeant Harrigan
 Ron Randell as Captain Smith
 Karl Lieffen as Moritz

References

External links

The Phony American at TCMDB

1961 films
West German films
Films directed by Ákos Ráthonyi
1960s German films